Rábanos is a municipality and town of northern Spain, Autonomous Community of Castile and León, province of Burgos, Shire of Montes de Oca, sub-shire of Tirón-Rioja Burgalesa.

According to the 2004 census (INE), the municipality has a population of 120 inhabitants (Alarcia town: 82, Rábanos town: 18 and Villamudria village: 20)

References

Municipalities in the Province of Burgos